The International Institute for Restorative Practices Graduate School (IIRP) is a private university in Bethlehem, Pennsylvania, focused on restorative practices.

History
The International Institute for Restorative Practices Graduate School grew out of the experience of the Community Service Foundation and Buxmont Academy (CSF Buxmont), two Pennsylvania nonprofit organizations that have been providing education, counseling, residential and other services for troubled youth and their families in south eastern Pennsylvania since 1977.

In 1994 the strategies employed by CSF Buxmont were influenced by a practice developed in New Zealand and Australia, originally called the Family Group Conference, and by the criminal justice reform movement that began in North America called restorative justice. CSF Buxmont integrated those practices and philosophies into their own programs and then developed educational programs, websites, international conferences and publications in support of an emerging discipline that came to be known as restorative practices.

CSF Buxmont advanced the new field of restorative practices through the 1990s. In 1999 it decided to create a specialized scientific and educational institution to foster the development of restorative practices. The International Institute for Restorative Practices was incorporated in 2000 as a nonprofit organization in Pennsylvania. It received approval from the Pennsylvania Department of Education to become a specialized graduate degree-granting institution in 2006.

In 2011, the IIRP was granted accreditation by the Middle States Commission on Higher Education.

Academics
The IIRP offers master's degree programs and a graduate certificate in restorative practices. Students have the option to complete most of their academic coursework online and via independent study.

Students
IIRP students include educators, counselors, social workers, criminal justice professionals, clergy, administrators and other adult learners.

Continuing education
The IIRP's division of continuing education offers restorative practices training, consulting and educational materials throughout the world. Learning modalities range from free webinars to multi-day events that provide practical skills and can be applied toward graduate credit with the addition of online course work. Topics include basic skills to proactively build relationships, reduce aggression, respond to harm, enhance leadership and related topics.

The IIRP and its related organizations have trained thousands of individuals since its inception as the Real Justice program in 1995. There are three programs:

 The Whole-School Change (formerly SaferSanerSchools) program works with schools to improve school culture, decrease disruptive behavior and conflict and help students take responsibility for their behavior and academic performance.
 The Toward a Restorative Community program works in schools and other organizations, including police, human services, court systems, corrections and neighborhood associations, to support an aligned restorative approach across these sectors.
 The Real Justice program works with police, probation and corrections to improve services for the three “customers” of the justice system: victims, offenders and the community.

References

External links
 

Private universities and colleges in Pennsylvania
Sociological organizations
Educational institutions established in 1977
Organizations based in Pennsylvania
1977 establishments in Pennsylvania